Sulfinamide is a functional group in organosulfur chemistry with the structural formula RS(O)NR'2 (where R and R' are organic substituents). This functionality is composed of a sulfur-carbon (S–C) and sulfur-nitrogen (S–N) single bonds, as well as a sulfur-oxygen double bond (S=O), resulting in a tetravalent sulfur centre (in resonance with its zwitterionic form). As a non-bonding electron pair is also present on the sulfur, these compounds are also chiral. They are sometimes referred to as S-chiral sulfinamides. Sulfinamides are amides of sulfinic acid (RS(O)OH).

Structure
Sulfinamides do not undergo inversion. They can therefore be synthesised and/or isolated in enantiopure forms. This has led to their use as chiral ammonia equivalents and more broadly as chiral auxiliaries.

Synthesis
Sulfinamides are traditionally produced by the reaction of sulfinyl chlorides with primary or secondary amines.  They also arise by the addition of Grignard reagents to sulfinylamines, followed by protonation:
RMgX  +  R'N=S=O  →   RS(O)(NR'MgX)
RS(O)(NR'MgX)  +  H2O  →  RS(O)(NR'H)  +  "MgX(OH)"

Yet another route entails peracid-oxidation of sulfenylphthalimides, which gives sulfinylphthalimides.

Examples
A common sulfinamide is tert-butanesulfinamide (Ellman's sulfinamide), p-toluenesulfinamide (Davis' sulfinamide), and 2,4,6-trimethylbenzenesulfinamide. 

Sulfinamides arise in nature by the addition of nitroxyl (HNO) to thiols:
RSH + HNO → RS(O)NH2

References

Amides
 
Functional groups